The 1890 Nevada gubernatorial election was held on November 4, 1890.

Republican nominee Roswell K. Colcord defeated Democratic nominee Theodore Winters with 53.27% of the vote.

General election

Candidates
Major party candidates
Theodore Winters, Democratic, former territorial representative, stockman, rancher and racehorse owner
Roswell K. Colcord, Republican, Nevada State Commissioner to the 1889 Paris Exposition

Results

References

1890
Nevada
Gubernatorial